Herbert Oswald Nicholas Kubly (April 26, 1915 – August 7, 1996) was an American author and playwright. For his first book, American in Italy, he won the 1956 U.S. National Book Award for Nonfiction.

Biography
Kubly was born and raised on a farm in the Swiss American community of New Glarus, Wisconsin. He received a bachelor's degree from the University of Wisconsin School of Journalism in 1937. His first professional work as a journalist was for the Pittsburgh Sun-Telegraph. He later wrote for the New York Herald Tribune.

His first play, Men to the Sea, was produced on Broadway in 1944. Between 1945 and 1947 he served as the music critic for Time magazine.

In 1950 Kubly became an associate professor of speech at the University of Illinois, but he left that position to accept a Fulbright grant to Italy, where he spent 18 months in 1950–1951. He taught creative writing at San Francisco State College in the 1960s. From 1969 to 1984, he was an English professor and writer-in-residence at the University of Wisconsin–Parkside.

He married Emily Lee Hill in 1989. He died in New Glarus at age 81.

Legacy
The University of Wisconsin–Parkside English Department established the Herbert Kubly Writing Award in 1996 in Kubly's memory.

Books
 American in Italy - 1955
 Easter in Sicily - 1956
 Varieties of Love (stories) - 1958
 Italy (Life World Library) - 1961
 The Whistling Zone (novel) - 1963
 At Large (autobiographical) - 1964
 Switzerland (Life World Library) - 1964
 Gods and Heroes - 1969
 The Duchess of Glover (novel) - 1975
 Native's Return - 1981
 The Parkside Stories - 1985

Plays
 Men to the Sea - 1944
The story concerns the wives of five sailors, who live at a boarding house in Brooklyn, New York while their husbands are away at sea.
 Inherit the Wind, with Waldemar Hansen  - 1946
A psychological drama set in Philadelphia in 1903. A production opened in London circa 1948. (Not the play of the same name by Jerome Lawrence and Robert E. Lee.)
 Punch and Judy - 1948
About the United Nations and the possibility of world organization.
 The Cocoon - 1954
Produced in London.
 Beautiful Dreamer - 1956
A comedy about a striptease artist trying to escape the police.
 Virus - 1973
Produced at the University of Wisconsin–Parkside

Further reading
 Current Biography Yearbook. 1959 edition. H.W. Wilson Co., 1959.
 Contemporary Authors. Volumes 5-8, 1st revision. Gale Research, 1969.
 Who Was Who in America. Volume 12, 1996-1998. Marquis Who's Who, 1998.

References

External links
 Herbert Kubly, "101 Years of Yodeling", Time.
 Herbert Kubly, "Discovering America", Wisconsin Alumnus.

1915 births
1996 deaths
National Book Award winners
Novelists from Wisconsin
University of Wisconsin–Madison School of Journalism & Mass Communication alumni
University of Wisconsin–Parkside faculty
People from New Glarus, Wisconsin
American male dramatists and playwrights
American male journalists
American male novelists
20th-century American male writers
20th-century American dramatists and playwrights
20th-century American journalists
20th-century American non-fiction writers
20th-century American novelists